This article shows all participating women's volleyball squads at the 2005 Bolivarian Games, held from August 13 to 17, 2005 in Pereira, Colombia.

Head Coach:

Head Coach:

Head Coach: Carlos Aparicio

Head Coach: Carlos Efrain Aparicios

References
Official Site

B
B
Bolivarian Games
Volleyball at the Bolivarian Games
B
Bolivarian Games